The sixth season of Australian reality television series The Block, titled The Block: All Stars, aired on the Nine Network. Both Scott Cam returned as host and Shelley Craft as "Challenge Master". Neale Whitaker & Shaynna Blaze returned as judges, Darren Palmer returned as a full-time judge replacing John McGrath who returned as a guest judge. The season premiered on Monday, 4 February 2013 at 7:00 pm.

Production for the series relocated from Melbourne—which had hosted the prior two seasons—to its original location of Bondi in Sydney to celebrate the tenth anniversary of the show's first season.

Contestants
This season saw the return of four former teams from past seasons of The Block retroactively named The "All-stars".

This block was located at 2, 4, 6. and 8 Tasman Street in Bondi NSW.

Score History

Results

Room Reveals

Judges' Scores

Auction

Ratings

Ratings data is from OzTAM and represents the live and same day average viewership from the 5 largest Australian metropolitan centres (Sydney, Melbourne, Brisbane, Perth and Adelaide).

References

2013 Australian television seasons
6